Michael or Mike Morrison may refer to:
 Michael Morrison (author) (born 1970), American author, software developer, and toy inventor
 Mike Morrison (baseball) (1867–1955), 19th-century Major League Baseball pitcher
 Mike Morrison (basketball, born 1967) American basketball player
 Mike Morrison (basketball, born 1989), American basketball player
 Michael Morrison (footballer) (born 1988), English footballer for Reading
 Mike Morrison (ice hockey) (born 1979), American ice hockey player
 Michael Morrison (actor) (1946–2006), American pornographic actor and director
 Michael Morrison (priest) (1908–1973), Irish Jesuit priest and army chaplain
 Mike Morrison, character in the film The Angry Hills

See also
 Morrison Stadium, the Michael G. Morrison, S.J., Stadium, soccer stadium in Nebraska